John Young Brown III (born June 2, 1963) is an American politician from the Commonwealth of Kentucky. Brown served as Secretary of State of Kentucky from 1996 to 2004. In 2007, Brown ran unsuccessfully for the Democratic nomination for Lieutenant Governor of Kentucky as the running mate of gubernatorial candidate Jody Richards, the Speaker of the Kentucky House of Representatives.

Biography 
Brown was born in Louisville, Kentucky. He is the son of John Y. Brown Jr., a former Governor of Kentucky and KFC magnate, and he is the grandson of former state legislator and United States Congressman John Y. Brown Sr.  Brown is also the half-brother of television reporter Pamela Brown.

Brown graduated from Kentucky's public school system. He received a B.A. degree (magna cum laude) and an M.B.A. from Bellarmine College. He earned his J.D. degree from the University of Kentucky College of Law.

In 1991, he married Rebecca J. Brown, an Oldham County native. They have a son and a daughter.

References

1963 births
Living people
Kentucky Democrats
Brown family of Kentucky
Politicians from Louisville, Kentucky
Secretaries of State of Kentucky
Bellarmine University alumni
University of Kentucky College of Law alumni